In mathematics, a preradical is a subfunctor of the identity functor in the category of left modules over a ring with identity. The class of all preradicals over R-mod is denoted by R-pr. With this order R-pr becomes a big lattice.

References

Stenstrom, Bo Rings of Quotients: An Introduction To Methods Of Ring Theory – Chapter 6, Springer, 
Bican, L., Kepka, T. and Nemec, P.  Rings, Modules, and Preradicals, Lecture Notes in Pure and Applied Mathematics, M. Dekker, 1982, 
Functors